William Morris Llewellyn (1 January 1878 – 12 March 1973) was a Welsh international rugby union player. He captained Wales in 1905 and London Welsh in 1902. He was a member of the winning Welsh team who beat the 1905 touring All Blacks in the famous Match of the Century. Llewellyn toured with the British Isles to Australasia in 1904 and won three Triple Crown trophies. He played club rugby for many teams, predominantly for Llwynypia and Newport.

Club career
Llewellyn began his club rugby days with Rhondda team Ystrad Rhondda before moving to Llwynypia. Although an unfashionable second tier club, Llwynypia had already provided two Welsh internationals, Dick Hellings and Billy Alexander, and Llewellyn joined their ranks when he was capped in 1899. In 1900 he moved to London to study at the Pharmaceutical College in Bloomsbury and joined a shabby London Welsh team. Llewellyn's arrival is seen as a turning point for the club; he was immediately made captain and turned the team from a losing side to a force to be reckoned with. On his return to Wales, Llewellyn joined first class club, Newport, who he would stay with through four seasons. On his retirement from international rugby Llewellyn returned to second class club rugby and the Rhondda when he joined Penygraig.

International career

Wales

Llewellyn made his debut for Wales against England in 1899, alongside Welsh greats Billy Bancroft and Gwyn Nicholls. It was an impressive display from Llewellyn and the team, with England thoroughly beaten and Llewellyn scoring four tries. Llewellyn scored again on his second game, which was against Scotland, and should have scored on his third match when he faced Ireland but for a poor choice by team mate Reg Skrimshire.

Llewellyn was part of the 1900, 1902 and 1905 Triple Crown winning sides, but his true moment of glory was being part of the great Welsh side of 1905 which beat the Original All Blacks.  He was considered a poor choice for the game by many critics as at the time of the game he had switched to Penygraig, a junior club, and he was considered too old for the wing. An uncharacteristic fumble within distance of the try line may have proven his detractors correct, but it did not affect the end result and his marking of the All Black Billy Wallace was noted as being ruthlessly impressive.

British Lions
In 1904 Llewellyn was chosen to tour Australasia alongside fellow Welsh winger Teddy Morgan under the captaincy of Bedell-Sivright. Llewellyn would play in four tests, scoring four tries in the first three tests against Australia.

International games played
Wales
  1899, 1900, 1901, 1902, 1904, 1905
  1899, 1900, 1901, 1902, 1903, 1904, 1905
  1905
  1899, 1900, 1901, 1902, 1904, 1905

British Isles
  1904 1st Test, 1904 2nd Test, 1904 3rd Test
  1904

Later career and death
Around 1905 Llewellyn opened a pharmacy in his birth town of Tonypandy. It is reported that during the 1910 Tonypandy Riot the rioters left Llewellyn's pharmacy unscathed due to his sporting celebrity.

When Llewellyn died in 1973 in Pontyclun at the age of 95, he was the last of the 1905 Wales team which beat the Original All Blacks. He is remembered as a modest man who was an excellent captain for club and country and was one of the most devastating wing players in Welsh rugby history.

Bibliography

References

1878 births
1973 deaths
British & Irish Lions rugby union players from Wales
British pharmacists
Cardiff RFC players
Glamorgan County RFC players
Llwynypia RFC players
London Welsh RFC players
Newport RFC players
Penygraig RFC players
People educated at Christ College, Brecon
Rugby union players from Tonypandy
Rugby union wings
Wales international rugby union players
Wales rugby union captains
Welsh rugby union players